The Disciples is a 1993 spy thriller by Joe Andrew, who was chairman of the 2000 Democratic National Convention, and V.C. Andrews.

Plot
From the bookjacket

"After a recruiter for the National Security Agency goes AWOL, NSA information analyst T.C. Steele must track her down."

Reception
Critical reception for The Disciples was mixed. Kirkus Reviews called the book "An engrossing thriller--and first novel--that displays a firm grasp of conspiracy theory". Publishers Weekly wrote that although the book had "a few good twists and a clean prose style", it had "little here to recommend".

References

External links
Joe Andrew CNN biography

American spy novels
1993 American novels